Astral Spirits Records is an independent record label specializing in free jazz, improvisation, and experimental music. Based in Austin, Texas, the label was founded in 2014 by musician Nathan Cross, who started Astral Spirits as a platform for "the new wave of heavy free jazz"; as the breadth of the label's offerings expanded, imprint Astral Editions became the home for its more experimental releases.

Astral Spirits has been featured in Bandcamp Daily, All About Jazz, the Chicago Reader, DownBeat, and the Free Jazz Collective; Rolling Stone has called the label "crucial" and "enormously prolific"; and in 2019, Tiny Mix Tapes included Astral Spirits among their favorite labels of the decade.

History 

In the early 2010s, Cross began to consider starting a record label or a live-recorded series as a way to stay involved in music without touring extensively. He spoke with Morgan Coy of Monofonus Press while in the early planning stages, and Coy encouraged him to start a label under the Monofonus umbrella. Cross named the label after a recurring song title in Joe McPhee's work: the first "Astral Spirits" track appeared on McPhee's Trinity, recorded in 1971, and he continued to use the name on later releases (e.g., Oleo and In the Spirit).

Astral Spirits began as a cassette-based label, but later expanded to include vinyl and CDs. All albums are also available as digital releases, but the catalogue is not available through low-revenue streaming services such as Spotify.

Since the label's inception, Cross has handled most logistics––aside from artwork and layout––himself, including curation, press, and shipping.

Astral Editions 

Cross launched Astral Editions in 2019, initially intending to make it a digital-only offshoot. The imprint began carrying physical products in 2020, distinguishing itself instead by a greater emphasis on experimentalism outside of the jazz continuum. The Astral Editions Bandcamp carries the tagline, "a primer on some of the best unheard experimental music being made today by names you don't know yet, but should".

Art and design 

The Astral Spirits logo was designed by Mason McFee, who also chose the label's signature Cooper Black font; for the first two years, McFee created all tape and LP artwork. Jaime Zuverza later took over design, eventually developing a template for the label's distinctive visual aesthetic; he listens to, and creates artwork specifically for, the majority of Astral Spirits releases.

Roster

References

Experimental music record labels
American jazz record labels
Jazz record labels
American independent record labels
American record labels
Record labels based in Texas
Noise music record labels